Maple Plain is a city in Hennepin County, Minnesota, United States.  The population was 1,768 at the 2010 census.

History
Maple Plain is named for the many sugar maples in its forests. Settlement of the area began in 1854 and revolved around Lake Independence to its north, and its outflow Pioneer Creek. In 1868 and 1869, the St. Paul, Pacific and Manitoba Railroad was built through Maple Plain. By 1871, Maple Plain had a post office. The city was incorporated as a village in 1912. Village water came to the town in 1939, sewer circa 1950, and blacktop in 1961.

Geography
U.S. Route 12 and Hennepin County Roads 19, 29, and 83 are four of the community's main routes. The city is boarded by Independence to the west.

Maple Plain is 20 miles west of Minneapolis on U.S. Highway 12. Pioneer Creek flows through Maple Plain's northwest corner.

Demographics

2010 census
As of the census of 2010, there were 1,768 people, 723 households, and 462 families living in the city. The racial makeup of the city was 94.2% White, 2.0% African American, 0.3% Native American, 0.6% Asian, 0.1% Pacific Islander, 1.4% from other races, and 1.4% from two or more races. Hispanic or Latino of any race were 4.8% of the population.

There were 723 households, of which 31.3% had children under the age of 18 living with them, 48.4% were married couples living together, 9.7% had a female householder with no husband present, 5.8% had a male householder with no wife present, and 36.1% were non-families. 29.5% of all households were made up of individuals, and 10.5% had someone living alone who was 65 years of age or older. The average household size was 2.36 and the average family size was 2.94.

The median age in the city was 43.1 years. 22.1% of residents were under the age of 18; 8.3% were between the ages of 18 and 24; 22.7% were from 25 to 44; 33.4% were from 45 to 64; and 13.6% were 65 years of age or older. The gender makeup of the city was 50.0% male and 50.0% female.

2000 census
As of the census of 2000, there were 2,088 people, 770 households, and 536 families living in the city. The racial makeup of the city was 97.65% White, 0.48% African American, 0.24% Native American, 0.62% Asian, 0.38% from other races, and 0.62% from two or more races. Hispanic or Latino of any race were 0.91% of the population.

There were 770 households, out of which 41.9% had children under the age of 18 living with them, 54.8% were married couples living together, 10.9% had a female householder with no husband present, and 30.3% were non-families. 25.1% of all households were made up of individuals, and 11.0% had someone living alone who was 65 years of age or older. The average household size was 2.61 and the average family size was 3.15.

In the city, the population was spread out, with 28.9% under the age of 18, 7.5% from 18 to 24, 32.3% from 25 to 44, 20.2% from 45 to 64, and 11.2% who were 65 years of age or older. The median age was 36 years. For every 100 females, there were 91.0 males. For every 100 females age 18 and over, there were 88.6 males.

The median income for a household in the city was $50,938, and the median income for a family was $58,977. Males had a median income of $40,114 versus $32,121 for females. The per capita income for the city was $22,218. About 2.6% of families and 4.4% of the population were below the poverty line, including 3.4% of those under age 18 and 10.9% of those age 65 or over.

Government

Notable people
Brock Lesnar, professional wrestler and former mixed martial artist, lived in Maple Plain from 2003 to 2014.

References

External links
City website

Cities in Minnesota
Cities in Hennepin County, Minnesota
Populated places established in 1912
1912 establishments in Minnesota